Heydarabad (also Romanized as Ḩeydarābād and Heidar Abad) is a village in Rostaq Rural District, in the Central District of Neyriz County, Fars Province, Iran. At the 2006 census, its population was 293, in 65 families.

References 

Populated places in Neyriz County